Spacy may refer to:

 Spacy (film), a 1981 experimental short film
 spaCy, an open-source software library for advanced natural language processing

See also 

 Spacey (disambiguation)